Apache Trafodion is an open-source Top-Level Project at the Apache Software Foundation. It was originally developed by the information technology division of Hewlett-Packard Company and HP Labs to provide the SQL query language on Apache HBase targeting big data transactional or operational workloads. The project was named after the Welsh word for transactions. As of April 2021, it is no longer actively developed.

Features
Trafodion is a relational database management system that runs on Apache Hadoop, providing support for transactional or operational workloads in a big data environment. The following is a list of key features:

 ANSI SQL language support
 JDBC and Open Database Connectivity (ODBC) connectivity for Linux and Windows clients
 Distributed ACID transaction protection across multiple statements, tables, and rows
 Compile-time and run-time optimizations for real-time operational workloads
 Support for large data sets using a parallel-aware query optimizer and a parallel data-flow execution engine

Transaction management features include:

 Begin, commit, and rollback work syntax, including SET TRANSACTION
 READ COMMITTED transactional isolation level
 Multiple SQL processes participating in the same transaction concurrently
 Recovery after region server, transaction manager, or node failure
 Support for region splits and balancing

History
Trafodion was launched by HP as an open-source project on June 10, 2014.

A version of Trafodion was released on January 29, 2015.

Trafodion became an Apache Incubation Project in May 2015.

Trafodion graduated from the Apache Incubator to become a Top-Level Project at the Apache Software Foundation in January 2018.

See also
 Big data
 Hadoop
 HBase
 NewSQL

References

External links
 

Trafodion
Bigtable implementations
Hadoop
Free database management systems
Structured storage